Otto Cordes (August 31, 1905 – December 24, 1970) was a German water polo player who competed in the 1928 Summer Olympics and in the 1932 Summer Olympics.

In 1928 he was part of the German team which won the gold medal. He played all three match and scored one goal. Four years later he won the silver medal with the German team. He played all four matches.

In 1968, his son, Burkhard Cordes, won a bronze medal in the 1968 Summer Olympics in sailing - class Flying Dutchman.

See also
 Germany men's Olympic water polo team records and statistics
 List of Olympic champions in men's water polo
 List of Olympic medalists in water polo (men)

References

External links
 

1905 births
1970 deaths
German male water polo players
Water polo players at the 1928 Summer Olympics
Water polo players at the 1932 Summer Olympics
Olympic water polo players of Germany
Olympic gold medalists for Germany
Olympic silver medalists for Germany
Olympic medalists in water polo
Medalists at the 1932 Summer Olympics
Medalists at the 1928 Summer Olympics